The 1979 Easter flood was one of the most costly and devastating floods to ever occur in Mississippi, United States, with $500–700 million in damages. $ billion in 2020 dollars. It was the result of the Pearl River being overwhelmed by severe rain upstream. Floodwaters sent the Pearl 15 feet above flood stage. More than 17,000 residents of Jackson, Flowood, Pearl, Richland, and other settlements in the Jackson metropolitan area were forced from their homes. The flooding of the Pearl River placed most of the streets of Jackson, the state's capital city, under several feet of water.

The river

The Pearl River is 490 miles long. It begins in Winston County, Mississippi and ends at the Mississippi Sound. Northeast of Jackson, the man-made Ross Barnett Reservoir is formed by a dam in the Pearl River. It flooded due to abnormally high rainfall in the preceding months (up to 150% more than usual). The water level reached a record-setting 43.28 feet on April 17, 1979.

Present
Flood stage at Jackson in 1979 was considered to be 18 feet (relative to the gauge datum on Pearl River), but as of 2004, this stage was set as 28 feet.

External links
NBC News Update Easter 1979 broadcast which includes coverage of the 1979 Easter flood.
National Weather Service Forecast Office: Jackson, MS

WLBT Archive: Flood of 1979
Lessons of the 1979 Easter Flood

References

Easter
Natural disasters in Mississippi
Floods in the United States
Easter Flood, 1979
Easter Flood, 1979
Easter Flood